Fidelity Japanese Values is a British investment trust dedicated to long term capital growth through investment in Japan. The company is listed on the London Stock Exchange and forms part of the FTSE All Share Index. The chairman is David Robins and the Trust is managed by Nicholas Price of Fidelity International.

References

External links
 London Stock Exchange - FID.JAP.VAL.
 Google Finance - Fidelity Japanese Values PLC(LON:FJV)
  Official site
 Fidelity Japanese Values
 FJV Fund Overview
 FJV Annual Report

Investment trusts of the United Kingdom
Investment in Japan